__NoToC__
Marcus Servilius Pulex Geminus was a Roman statesman during the Second Punic War, and the early decades of the second century BC.  He was a renowned warrior, whose martial prowess was commemorated on coins issued by several of his descendants.

Background
Servilius was the younger son of Gaius Servilius Geminus, praetor about 220 BC, and grandson of Publius Servilius Geminus, consul in 252.  The Servilii Gemini were a branch of an old and distinguished patrician family, but either Gaius or his sons went over to the plebeians, for reasons that are not entirely clear.  Servilius' elder brother, Gaius, was tribune of the plebs in 211 BC, consul in 203, and dictator in 202.  Servilius' additional surname, Pulex, refers to a flea, but the circumstances of this cognomen are not mentioned in any source.

Career
Servilius was augur in 211 BC, curule aedile in 204, magister equitum in 203, and consul in 202.  During his consulship, he was assigned to Etruria with two legions; in 201 his imperium was prorogued, and he remained in Etruria as proconsul.

In 167 BC, during the debate whether to grant a triumph to Lucius Aemilius Paullus, Geminus addressed the people in favor of Paullus, showing his multiple scars earned in battle in order to impress the crowd. Indeed, Servilius was especially known for his dueling abilities, as he allegedly defeated twenty-three enemies in single combat.  Five of his descendants who served as triumviri monetales depicted him on their coins.

Legacy
Servilius was probably the father of Marcus Servilius, one of the military tribunes in 181 BC, who was appointed pontifex in 170.  The Vatiae, a plebeian family of the Servilii, including several of the moneyers whose coins depict Marcus Servilius Pulex Geminus, are thought to be descended through this line.

Gallery

References

Bibliography
 Titus Livius (Livy), History of Rome.
 Lucius Mestrius Plutarchus (Plutarch), Lives of the Noble Greeks and Romans.
 August Pauly, Georg Wissowa, et alii, Realencyclopädie der Classischen Altertumswissenschaft (Scientific Encyclopedia of the Knowledge of Classical Antiquities, abbreviated RE or PW), J. B. Metzler, Stuttgart (1894–1980).
 Michael Crawford, Roman Republican Coinage, Cambridge University Press (1974, 2001).

3rd-century BC Roman augurs
3rd-century BC Roman consuls
2nd-century BC Roman augurs
Curule aediles
Magistri equitum (Roman Republic)
Marcus, Pulex
Year of birth unknown
Year of death unknown